The Secret Is Out is the eighth overall album of gospel singer Vanessa Bell Armstrong, and first under the banner of major gospel label Verity Records. This largely traditional release, produced entirely by John P. Kee, revisited several signature songs from Armstrong's early career such as "Peace Be Still," "Faith That Conquers," and "Nobody But Jesus." The latter was covered by singer Kelly Price with Bell Armstrong as a duetting guest.

Track listing 
 I'm Encouraged (3:41)
 Good News Blues (4:45)
 I Really Love You (5:43)
 Vanessa's Medley: What Shall I Render / Faith That Conquers / Nobody But Jesus / For God So Loved The World / Peace Be Still / The Denied Stone (6:00)
 Tear (4:25)
 Choose Again (duet with John P. Kee) (4:40)
 The Secret Is Out (3:00)
 Love Lifted Me (4:35)
 I Am Determined (5:15)
 Little Sister (4:55)
 There Is Nothing (4:40)
 Ninth Month (5:13)
 The Secret Is Out (Interlude) (1:30)
 Love Lifted Me (Remix) (7:26)

References

Vanessa Bell Armstrong albums
1995 albums